The  or  separates Awaji Island from Wakayama, Wakayama Prefecture, Japan and connects the Osaka Bay in the north to the Kii Channel in the south. The total width is 11 km, but the islands of Tomogashima reduce the distance to be spanned by a proposed bridge.
The strait forms part of the Setonaikai National Park.

See also
 Akashi Strait

References

Straits of Japan
Landforms of Wakayama Prefecture